Brown is the debut studio album of the industrial rock band Grotus. It was released in 1991 by Spirit Music Industries.

Track listing

Personnel 
Adapted from the Brown liner notes.

Grotus
 John Carson – bass guitar, sampler
 Lars Fox – vocals, sampler
 Adam Tanner – sampler, guitar, 6-string bass guitar
Additional musicians
 Bruce Boyd – drums
 Marc Henry – drum programming (1, 4, 5, 10)
 Dan Poppe – additional drums (2, 11), executive producer

Production and additional personnel
 David Bryson – engineering (6, 8)
 John Golden – mastering
 Keith Moreau – editing
 Damien Rasmussen – production, engineering
 Frank Wiedemann – photography, design

Release history

References

External links 
 Brown at Discogs (list of releases)

1991 debut albums
Grotus albums